Dennis Walker (10 November 1913 – 30 August 1984) was a Canadian swimmer. He competed in the men's 100 metre backstroke at the 1932 Summer Olympics.

References

External links
 

1913 births
1984 deaths
Canadian male backstroke swimmers
Olympic swimmers of Canada
Swimmers at the 1932 Summer Olympics
Swimmers from Victoria, British Columbia